The 1956 Memphis State Tigers football team was an American football team that represented Memphis State College (now known as the University of Memphis) as an independent during the 1956 NCAA College Division football season. In their tenth season under head coach Ralph Hatley, Memphis State compiled a 5–4–1 record and won the Burley Bowl.

Schedule

References

Memphis State
Memphis Tigers football seasons
Memphis State Tigers football